Nauganwan railway station is a small railway station in Ratlam district, Madhya Pradesh. Its code is NGW. It serves Nauganwan area. The station consists of single platform, which is not well sheltered. It lacks many facilities including water and sanitation.

References

Railway stations in Ratlam district
Ratlam railway division